Meadow Shores Park is an unincorporated community in LaGrange and Steuben counties, in the U.S. state of Indiana.

Geography

References

Unincorporated communities in Steuben County, Indiana
Unincorporated communities in Indiana